The MG HS is a compact crossover SUV manufactured by Chinese automobile manufacturer SAIC Motor under the British MG marque. The vehicle was launched in 2018, replacing the MG GS. In China, it is the brand's largest crossover SUV above the ZS and One.

Overview 
The HS is the production model of the concept MG X-Motion. It debuted at the 2018 Beijing Auto Show. Engine options of the MG HS include an inline four 1.5-litre turbo petrol engine producing , and an inline four 2.0-litre turbo petrol engine, producing .

International markets 
In Thailand, the HS was launched on 25 September 2019. The HS was offered with the 1.5-litre FFV engine, front-wheel drive, 7-speed dual-clutch transmission (DCT) with three trims: 1.5 C, 1.5 D and 1.5 X Sunroof.

In Indonesia, the HS went on sale starting on 13 August 2020 with the variants are available: Excite and Ignite. The Indonesian HS is imported from Thailand and only offered in 1.5-litre turbo petrol engine and 7-speed DCT each of the variant models. On 2 June 2021, the i-SMART Magnify variant was launched.

The HS was introduced in Australia in February 2020. Sourced from China, it is offered in several trim levels. A 1.5-litre four-cylinder turbocharged petrol FWD version is equipped with a seven-speed dual-clutch gearbox, and is offered in Core, Vibe, Excite and Essence variants. A 2.0-litre four-cylinder turbocharged petrol AWD with a six-speed dual-clutch gearbox is offered in Excite X and Essence X variants.

The HS was introduced alongside the ZS and 5 in Mexico on 21 October 2020, marking the return of the MG marque in the Mexican market after 15 years. The HS is offered in Excite and Trophy trim lines.

The MG HS Trophy was launched in Pakistan in October 2020.

The MG HS was launched in Philippines on 17 March 2022. 

The MG HS was launched in Taiwan on
28 July 2022.

Safety 
The HS is equipped with a standard emergency braking system and lane assist, bundled in the MG Pilot kit. The adaptive cruise control system is also given along with eight airbags, hill descent control (HDC), antilock braking system (ABS) and electronic brakeforce distribution (EBD). It was rated with five stars by Euro NCAP tests.

eHS / HS Plug-in / HS PHEV 
The plug-in hybrid version of the HS is the first model to feature MG’s all-new hybrid powertrain, which comprises a turbocharged 1.5-litre four-cylinder petrol engine, a  battery pack and a  electric motor.  It is mated to a 10-speed EDU II automatic gearbox, which consists of 6-speed internal combustion engine and 4-speed electric motor.

In 27 October 2020, the MG HS PHEV was released in Thailand.

The HS PHEV was released in Australia in the "Essence" trim in March 2021.

MG Pilot/Navigator (facelift) 
In September 2020, the facelifted HS made its appearance at the 2020 Auto China in Beijing as the MG Pilot. The Pilot, which is often also translated as Navigator, is the name given to the mid-life facelift of the HS, featuring the "third-generation design language" according to SAIC. The Pilot and the second-generation MG 5 are the first models to feature the newer MG family design language.

Sales 

The HS was the UK's best selling car in January 2023, moving 3,481 units, and 4th best selling for 2023 YTD  thanks primarily to stock being readily available.

References

External links 

 

HS
Cars introduced in 2018
2020s cars
Compact sport utility vehicles
Crossover sport utility vehicles
Front-wheel-drive vehicles
Hybrid sport utility vehicles
Euro NCAP small off-road
Plug-in hybrid vehicles
Cars of China